William Henry Terry Tucker (5 January 1843 – 19 February 1919) was a New Zealand soldier, farmer, clerk, interpreter, land agent, and politician. 

He was born in Auckland, New Zealand in 1843. William Tucker lost his parent early in his life; his mother died when he was two and his father, Henry Tucker, died when he was seven. He was Mayor of Gisborne in 1887 and 1888. On 22 January 1907, he was appointed to the Legislative Council. He served for one term until 21 January 1914.

References

1843 births
1919 deaths
Members of the New Zealand Legislative Council
Mayors of Gisborne, New Zealand
People from Auckland